
Gmina Swarzędz is an urban-rural gmina (administrative district) in Poznań County, Greater Poland Voivodeship, in west-central Poland.

Villages
Apart from the town of Swarzędz, Gmina Swarzędz contains the villages and settlements of Bogucin, Garby, Gortatowo, Gruszczyn, Janikowo, Jasin, Karłowice, Katarzynki, Kobylnica, Kruszewnia, Ligowiec, Łowęcin, Mechowo, Paczkowo, Puszczykowo-Zaborze, Rabowice, Sarbinowo, Sokolniki Gwiazdowskie, Święcinek, Uzarzewo, Wierzenica, Wierzonka and Zalasewo.

Neighbouring gminas
Gmina Swarzędz is bordered by the city of Poznań and by the gminas of Czerwonak, Kleszczewo, Kostrzyn and Pobiedziska.

References
Polish official population figures 2006

Swarzedz
Poznań County